is a former Japanese football player.

Playing career
Nishiwaki was born in Ogaki on August 1, 1979. He joined J1 League club JEF United Ichihara from youth team in 1997. Although he played several matches as forward every seasons, he could not play many matches. In 2001, he moved to German club Wacker Burghausen. In 2002, he returned to Japan and joined J2 League club Montedio Yamagata. However he could not play many matches. In 2003, he moved to Regional Leagues club Shizuoka FC. In 2005, he moved to his local club FC Gifu in Regional Leagues. He retired end of 2006 season.

Club statistics

References

External links

1979 births
Living people
Association football people from Gifu Prefecture
Japanese footballers
J1 League players
J2 League players
JEF United Chiba players
Montedio Yamagata players
FC Gifu players
Association football forwards